Harry Sacher (3 September 1881 – 10 May 1971) was a British businessman, journalist, and Zionist leader. He was appointed director of Marks & Spencer in 1932.

Early life and education
Sacher was born in Shoreditch, Middlesex, the fourth of five children of Polish Jews Jacob and Esther Sacher. His father, a tailor, emigrated from Suwałki, Russian Poland. He attended New College, Oxford.

Career
Sacher wrote for The Manchester Guardian as a political analyst.

In Mandatory Palestine, Sacher co-founded the law firm of Sacher, Horowitz & Klebanoff. The firm had offices in Jerusalem and Haifa, as well as a branch in London.  Already by the 1920s, Sacher became the most prominent attorney in the country. He was legal adviser to the Palestine Zionist Executive and also counted the Municipality of Tel Aviv among his regular clients. At the same time he was an enthusiast of English law and was among the main opponents of the Hebrew Law of Peace system that aspired for autonomy from Palestine's British-based system of law and courts. His most important private client (and personal confidant) had been Pinhas Rutenberg, who, under his legal guidance, created the Jaffa Electric Company and later the Palestine Electric Company under British concession. Harry Sacher was, therefore, an important figure in the process of providing Palestine with electric energy.

An active Zionist, he was elected to the Executive of the WZO, and worked closely with Chaim Weizmann in their efforts to define and lead the WZO during the 1920s and 1930s, and contributed to early drafts of the Balfour Declaration. He had significant involvement in the establishment of Hebrew University of Jerusalem.

Sacher married Miriam Marks, the sister of Simon Marks in 1915. He subsequently joined Marks & Spencer, and was made director in 1932.

Death and legacy
Sacher died in Westminster in 1971. He was survived by his wife, Miriam, and their sons, Michael M. Sacher, and Gabriel Sacher.

Sacher Park, the largest park in Jerusalem, was named in his memory.

Books

 Zionism and the Jewish future. Macmillan Company. 1916 online
 Jewish emancipation. English Zionist Federation. 1917 online
 Israel.the establishment of a state. British Book Centre. 1952, Hyperion. 1976
 Israel, the Arabs and the Foreign Office, Zionist Federation of Great Britain and Ireland, 1956
 Zionist portraits, and other essays. Blond. 1959

References

External links
 Drawn from the Encyclopaedia Judaica
"A Jewish Palestine", Sacher writing in the Atlantic, July 1919

1881 births
1971 deaths
British Zionists
British Jews
British male journalists
Harry
Marks & Spencer people
British people of Polish-Jewish descent
People from Shoreditch